This is a listing of Australian rules footballers who made their senior debut for a Victorian Football League (VFL) club in 1922.

Debuts by clubs

References

Australian rules football records and statistics
Australian rules football-related lists
1922 in Australian rules football